L'Horme is a commune in the Loire department in central France.

Population

Twin towns
L'Horme is twinned with:

  Pian di Scò, Italy, since 1993

See also
Communes of the Loire department

References

Communes of Loire (department)